Philippe Mangou (born 26 January 1952) was the head of the armed forces of Ivory Coast from 2004 until 2011.

Biography
He studied law at the University of Cocody-Abidjan.  In November 2004, Laurent Gbagbo made him Chef d'État Major des Armées (Chief of the Defence Staff, the ninth in the history of the country), succeeding Mathias Doue.

Long loyal to Gbagbo, Mangou sought refuge in the residence of the South African ambassador on 31 March 2011, as Alassane Ouattara's forces entered Abidjan.

On 4 April, however, Mangou left the South African ambassador's residence in Abidjan and rejoined the government forces. On Ouattara's TV station, Serges Alla, a journalist claimed: "Mangou was forced to leave the South African embassy because some of his relatives were made hostage by diehard supporters of Gbagbo, and Gbagbo militiamen were putting pressure on him, saying they would bomb his village if he doesn't show himself or doesn't return to the Gbagbo army."

Decorations and badges

References

1952 births
Living people
Ivorian military personnel
People from Abidjan
Officers of the Ordre du Mérite Maritime
Commandeurs of the Légion d'honneur
Officers of the Ordre national du Mérite
Recipients of the Order pro Merito Melitensi